Christopher Nicholas Day (born 28 July 1975) is an English former professional footballer who played as a goalkeeper.

Day started his career at Tottenham Hotspur, where he spent five years, making one Premier League appearance for the North London club. He joined Crystal Palace for a fee of £225,000 in July 1996, whom he played regularly for throughout the 1996–97 season. The following season, Day signed for Watford, and he played for the club in the Premier League during the 1999–2000 season. He spent a further season at the club, before joining Lincoln City on a three-month deal in December 2000. He was released by Lincoln, and later joined Queens Park Rangers, spending three and a half years at the club, whilst also having brief spells on loan at Aylesbury United and Preston North End.

He left QPR in 2005, and signed for Oldham Athletic ahead of the 2005–06 season. He played for the club for a season before joining Millwall in the summer of 2006. After two seasons with Millwall, Day signed for his local club, Stevenage, on a free transfer in August 2008. He was part of the club's successful FA Trophy campaign during the 2008–09 season, as well as being first-choice goalkeeper as the club earned back-to-back promotions from the Conference Premier to League One. In May 2016, he combined his playing role alongside becoming the club's goalkeeping coach. Day left Stevenage in July 2018 having made over 350 appearances for the club. Day also represented the England under-21 team six times between 1996 and 1997.

Early life
Born in Walthamstow, London, Day originally played as a striker for schoolboy team Ridgeway Rovers, playing in the same team as David Beckham, and scoring 63 goals in one season for the Chingford based club. Due to his height, Day was later made the team's goalkeeper.

Club career

Early career
He was signed by Tottenham Hotspur as a trainee at the age of 15, and progressed through the youth system at the North London club. Day did not make any Premier League appearances during his four years at the club. Ahead of the 1995–96 season, Day played in all four of Tottenham's UEFA Intertoto Cup group games, with the club fielding a weakened team in the competition. In all four of the games, the team was made up of loan players from lower division teams in the local area, as well as youth and reserve team players, with Tottenham recording one victory, a 2–1 away win at Rudar Velenje. Shortly before his 21st birthday, Day joined Crystal Palace in a deal worth £225,000. He made 26 appearances for Palace during the 1996–97 season, making his debut in a 1–0 defeat against Birmingham City at St Andrew's. He was considered second choice for the remainder of the season, behind Carlo Nash, after playing in a 2–1 defeat at Southend United.

Watford
In the summer of 1997, Day joined Watford after one season at Selhurst Park. He was part of the deal that saw Kevin Miller move to Palace. He made his Watford debut in a 4–0 League Cup defeat away to Sheffield United, scoring an own-goal in the first-half. He made one further appearance for Watford during the 1997–98 season, a 1–0 defeat away to Fulham in the Football League Trophy. The following season, Day did not play for Graham Taylor's team in Watford's 1998–99 play-off winning season, although won a medal as an unused substitute in the final.

During the 1999–00 season, Day played 11 times for the club in the Premier League. He started in the club's first match in the highest tier of English football against Wimbledon, as well as keeping a clean sheet in the club's 1–0 victory against Liverpool at Anfield. He played his last game for Watford in a 1–0 victory over Coventry City in May 2000, as the signing of Espen Baardsen in the summer of 2000 meant Day became third-choice goalkeeper. Midway through the 2000–01 season, Day joined Lincoln City on a three-month loan agreement. He made his Lincoln debut in a 1–1 draw at home to Rochdale, and went on to play a further thirteen times for the Lincolnshire club during the loan.

Queens Park Rangers
In the summer of 2001, Day joined Queens Park Rangers on a free transfer, following his release from Watford. He made his QPR debut in a 1–0 victory over Stoke City in August 2001. He made 19 more appearances during the 2001–02 season, despite being dropped in October 2001 due to the arrival of Fraser Digby. Shortly after, Day suffered a broken leg in a home game against Oldham Athletic after a challenge with striker Matthew Tipton. As part of his lengthy recovery plan, he was loaned to non-League Aylesbury United in October 2002, and made his debut for the club in a 0–0 home draw against Harrow Borough. He made seven appearances for Aylesbury, playing his last game for the club in December 2002, a 1–1 draw away to Basingstoke Town. Day returned to the QPR first–team towards the latter stages of the 2002–03 season. He played in goal for the rest of the season, and was part of the team that lost 1–0 in the play–off final to Cardiff City in the Millennium Stadium.

Day played 34 times for QPR during the 2003–04 season. He kept 16 clean sheets from August 2003 to February 2004; including five clean sheets in six matches during November 2003. He sustained an injury in February 2004, which meant QPR signed Lee Camp on loan to cover in his absence, and his Camp's form ultimately kept Day out of the team when he returned. Day was an unused substitute in QPR's 3–1 win against Sheffield Wednesday, a victory that ultimately secured automatic promotion back to the Championship. Day returned to the first-team for the club's return to the Championship during the 2004–05 season, playing 33 games. He was dropped in January 2005 in favour of loanee Simon Royce, and was, as a result, allowed to move to Preston North End on a one-month loan deal. He made his Preston debut in a 2–0 defeat to Nottingham Forest, as well as making five more appearances for the Lancashire club; keeping two clean sheets during his time there.

Oldham and Millwall
Having played two more games for QPR on his return, Day was allowed to leave for Oldham Athletic a week before the start of the 2005–06 season. He became the first-choice goalkeeper at Boundary Park, playing 36 games during the season and keeping ten clean sheets. Then manager Ronnie Moore took the opportunity to sign out of favour Derby County goalkeeper Lee Grant on loan at the end of the January transfer window, and Day subsequently became second-choice for the remainder of the season. Day left Oldham at the end of the season and opted to sign for Millwall in June 2006. He made his Millwall debut in a 3–2 defeat to Cheltenham Town two weeks into the start of the new season. Day played seven times during Millwall's 2006–07 campaign, six times in the league and one further appearance for Millwall in the Football League Trophy. He regained his place as first-choice goalkeeper for the start of Millwall's league season; keeping two clean sheets in his first two games. He made a further seven appearances during the club's 2007–08 campaign, and left at the end of the season.

Stevenage

In August 2008, Day signed for Conference Premier club Stevenage on a two-year deal. At the time of Day joining Stevenage, the club were second bottom of the Conference Premier table having conceded 13 goals in four games. Day made his debut for the Hertfordshire club in a 1–1 draw at home to Crawley Town on 25 August 2008. The arrival of Day witnessed an upturn in form in not only the club's defence, but also in the overall team, as the team remained unbeaten for 24 games from December 2008 to April 2009, a club record. Stevenage made the play-offs that season, losing in the semi-finals against Cambridge United. He also started in six of the club's FA Trophy campaign during that season, keeping four clean sheets and playing in the side's 2–0 win against York City in the final at Wembley Stadium. Day was a regular throughout his first season with Stevenage, making 52 appearances for the club and keeping 20 clean sheets in all competitions.

Day remained as Stevenage's first-choice for the club's 2009–10 season. He made his 100th appearance for Stevenage in a 2–0 victory over Forest Green Rovers on 10 April 2010. Day played in Stevenage's 2–0 win against Kidderminster Harriers at Aggborough on 17 April 2010, the game that ultimately secured Stevenage's promotion to the Football League for the first time in the club's history. He also played in the club's last Conference Premier game of the season, a 1–0 victory against York City, after the game the team were presented with their winners' medals and the competition trophy. Day made 42 appearances during the club's successful league campaign, keeping 24 clean sheets; the most clean sheets recorded in the league. The club also recorded the best defensive record in the league, conceding 24 goals all season. Day made 52 appearances during the season. Day signed a new two–year contract with the Hertfordshire club at the end of the season.

Day started in Stevenage's first Football League fixture, a 2–2 draw against Macclesfield Town on 7 August 2010. He helped Stevenage earn their first away point of the season in a 1–1 draw at Aldershot Town, saving Marvin Morgan's 86th-minute penalty to keep the scores tied. Stevenage's tight defence had helped Stevenage earn one of the four play-off spots as a result of finishing in sixth place. He kept two clean sheets in Stevenage's games against Accrington Stanley in the play-off semi-finals, which Stevenage won by a 3–0 aggregate scoreline. Stevenage earned promotion to League One after a 1–0 victory against Torquay United at Old Trafford on 28 May 2011, with Day playing the whole game and keeping a clean sheet. Similarly to the 2009–10 season, Stevenage's success was built on a tight defence, with the club conceding the fewest number of goals during the 2010–11 League Two season, with Day keeping 19 clean sheets during the campaign. Day played all of Stevenage's 56 games during the season, playing every minute of every game.

Ahead of the 2011–12 season, Day dislocated his finger in Stevenage's pre-season victory over Fulham XI. He was subsequently ruled out of first-team action for a month, missing Stevenage's first three games of the season. Day made his first appearance of the campaign on 16 August 2011, playing the whole game in Stevenage's first win of season, a 3–1 away victory at AFC Bournemouth. Three days later, Day signed a contract extension with the club. He remained as Stevenage's first-choice goalkeeper for the remainder of the season, missing one further league match during the campaign. Stevenage's FA Cup run to the Fifth Round also presented Day with the opportunity to face his former club, and the team he supports, Tottenham Hotspur. The tie, played at Broadhall Way, ended goalless, with Day keeping a clean sheet. He also played in the replay at White Hart Lane in March 2012, which ended 3–1 in Tottenham's favour, the three goals scored by Tottenham were the only goals Day conceded in the club's six FA Cup games. During the season, Day made 52 appearances in all competitions, as Stevenage lost in the League One play-off semi-final to Sheffield United. Only league champions Charlton Athletic conceded fewer goals than Stevenage throughout the season.

He started in Stevenage's first game of the 2012–13 season, a 3–1 victory over AFC Wimbledon in the League Cup on 14 August 2012, and kept successive clean sheets during the month as Stevenage started the season in good form. Despite the club being unbeaten in their first nine league games with Day in goal, he was dropped by manager Gary Smith in favour of pre-season signing Steve Arnold following Stevenage's 2–2 draw with Bury on 29 September 2012. He was subsequently second-choice goalkeeper for most of the remainder of the season, although briefly returned to first-team action after Arnold had been unavailable due to suspension. Following the return of manager Graham Westley, who brought Day to the club in August 2008, he ended the season by playing in Stevenage's remaining two league fixtures. He made 19 appearances in all competitions during the campaign. Day signed a new one-year contract extension at Stevenage in May 2013.

On 17 May 2014, Day signed a new one-year contract at Stevenage.

Personal life
He was married in Stevenage in June 2004. Day, along with his wife, previously owned a pub in Stevenage, located just over a mile away from Broadhall Way. He is a supporter of Tottenham Hotspur, and goes to watch them whenever he is not playing.

Career statistics

A.  The "Other" column constitutes appearances and goals (including those as a substitute) in the UEFA Intertoto Cup, FA Trophy, Football League Trophy, and play-offs.

Honours
Watford
 First Division play-offs: 1998–99

Stevenage
 FA Trophy: 2008–09; runner-up: 2009–10
 Conference Premier: 2009–10
 League Two play-offs: 2010–11

England U21
 UEFA European Under-18 Football Championship: 1993

Individual
 Goalkeeping Golden Glove: November 2011
 Football League One Golden Glove: 2011–12

References

External links

1975 births
Living people
People from Walthamstow
English footballers
Association football goalkeepers
Tottenham Hotspur F.C. players
Crystal Palace F.C. players
Watford F.C. players
Lincoln City F.C. players
Queens Park Rangers F.C. players
Aylesbury United F.C. players
Preston North End F.C. players
Oldham Athletic A.F.C. players
Millwall F.C. players
Stevenage F.C. players
Premier League players
English Football League players
National League (English football) players